Bnei Brak, Bene Beraq or Beneberak is:
 Beneberak, a Biblical city
 Bnei Brak, a modern city in Israel, located 4 kilometers north of its Biblical counterpart